Edwin Luther Kevin Johnson (9 April 1951 – 8 March 2016) was a Bahamian sprinter. He competed in the men's 200 metres at the 1968 Summer Olympics and the men's 100 metres at the 1972 Summer Olympics.

References

1951 births
2016 deaths
Athletes (track and field) at the 1968 Summer Olympics
Athletes (track and field) at the 1972 Summer Olympics
Bahamian male sprinters
Olympic athletes of the Bahamas
Athletes (track and field) at the 1966 British Empire and Commonwealth Games
Athletes (track and field) at the 1970 British Commonwealth Games
Athletes (track and field) at the 1971 Pan American Games
Commonwealth Games competitors for the Bahamas
Pan American Games competitors for the Bahamas
Place of birth missing